USS Cabezon (SS-334) was a Balao-class submarine of the United States Navy, named for the cabezon, a saltwater fish of sculpin family inhabiting the North Atlantic and North Pacific Oceans (cabezon means "big head" in Spanish).

History
Cabezon was launched 27 August 1944 by Electric Boat Company, Groton, Connecticut; sponsored by Mrs. Adelaide Prescott Cooley (née Morris), wife of Captain Thomas Ross Cooley, commanding officer of USS Washington; and commissioned 30 December 1944.

World War II
Cabezon departed New London, Connecticut, 19 February 1945 for Key West, Florida, where she underwent 3 weeks of training and providing services for the Fleet Sound School. She then sailed via the Panama Canal, to Pearl Harbor, arriving 15 March 1945.

From 25 May to 11 July 1945 Cabezon conducted her first war patrol in the Sea of Okhotsk, sinking a 2,631-ton Japanese cargo vessel on 19 June. She refitted at Midway until 4 August, then departed for Saipan to serve as target ship for surface force training exercises.

Post war service
From 7 September 1945 until 12 January 1946 she engaged in local operations and training in Philippine waters, based at Subic Bay.

On 6 February 1946 Cabezon arrived at San Diego, operating from that port until her base was changed to Pearl Harbor. Subsequent to her arrival there on 20 November 1946, she participated in local operations and training cruises for submariners of the Naval Reserve there and on the west coast with intervening cruises to the South Pacific, the North Pacific, and in 1947 participated in Operation Blue Nose in the Chukchi Sea. She also made two cruises to the Far East (18 March – 29 July 1950 and 21 April – 16 October 1952), the second of which included a reconnaissance patrol in the vicinity of La Perouse Strait, between Hokkaidō, Japan, and Sakhalin, U.S.S.R.

Cabezon sailed for Mare Island 21 April 1953 to start inactivation and was placed out of commission in reserve there 24 October 1953 and laid up in the Pacific Reserve Fleet. Struck from the Naval Register, 15 May 1970, she was sold for scrapping, 28 December 1971.

Awards

 Combat Action Ribbon
 Asiatic-Pacific Campaign Medal with one battle star for World War II service
 World War II Victory Medal
 Navy Occupation Service Medal with "ASIA" clasp
 China Service Medal
 National Defense Service Medal
 Korean Service Medal
 Republic of Korea Presidential Unit Citation (Republic of Korea)
 United Nations Korea Medal (United Nations)
 Korean War Service Medal (Republic of Korea)

Cabezon's single war patrol was designated "successful". She is credited with having sunk a total of 2,631 tons of shipping.

Notable former crew
Theodore F. Brophy, World War II

References

External links

  Kill Record:  USS Cabezon

Balao-class submarines
World War II submarines of the United States
Cold War submarines of the United States
Ships built in Groton, Connecticut
1944 ships